Hallah may refer to:

Challah, a Jewish braided bread eaten on the Sabbath and holidays
Dough offering, given to Jewish priests
Hallah (tractate), a tractate of the Mishnah and Talmud
Hallah, Yemen, a village

See also
Challah (disambiguation)
Hala (disambiguation)
Halah (disambiguation)
Halla (disambiguation)